The Auckland University Students' Association (AUSA), founded in 1891, represents students at the University of Auckland. AUSA organises student events, publicises student issues, administers student facilities, and assists affiliated student clubs and societies. It also produces Craccum magazine and bFM radio station.

The constitution of the AUSA centres the organisation around student advocacy and the provision of welfare services. Today AUSA has 27,000 members out of 42,000 equivalent full-time students enrolled at the University of Auckland.

AUSA has over 100 affiliated clubs, the student bar Shadows, University Book Shop, Student Job Search, market days and events such as Orientation, Summer Shakespeare, End of Daze, Capping week, Womensfest, Cultural Mosaic, Blues Awards and Ecofest.

Executive 
The AUSA Executive consists of Officers and Portfolios.

Officers
 President
 Education Vice President
 Engagement Vice President
 Welfare Vice President
 Treasurer-Secretary

Portfolios
 Women's Rights Officer
 Queer Rights Officer
 International Students Officer
 Postgraduate Students Officer
 Pacific Island Students' Officer
 Māori Students Officers
 after an Executive election, the President-Elect.

 2021 Anamika Harirajh
 2020 George Barton
 2019 Anand Rama
 2018 Anna Cusack
 2017 Will Matthews
 2016 Will Matthews
 2015 Paul Smith
 2014 Cate Bell
 2013 Dan Haines
 2012 Arena Williams
 2011 Joe McCrory
 2010 Elliott Blade
 2009 Darcy Peacock
 2008 David Do
 2007 Lesieli Oliver
 2006 Dan Bidois
 2005 Greg Langton
 2004 Kate Sutton
 2003 Scott Kelly
 2002 Ross Burns
 2001 Kane Stanford
 2000 Kane Stanford
 1999 Efeso Collins
 1998 Mark O'Brien
 1997 Phillip Stevens
 1996 Phillip Stevens
 1995 Brendon Lane
 1994 Cyrus Richardson
 1993 Richard Watson
 1992 Douglas Sadlier
 1991 Douglas Sadlier 
 1990 Ella Henry
 1989 Des Amanano
 1988 Richard Foster
 1987 Graham Watson
 1986 Graham Watson
 1985 Graham Watson
 1984 Trish Mullins 
 1983 John Broad / Jonathan Blakeman
 1982 David Kirkpatrick
 1981 Wayne McIntosh
 1980 Kevin Hague

Membership 

AUSA membership is free to all current students of the University of Auckland.

As required by legislation, the University Council conducted a student referendum in 1999 on whether membership in AUSA should be voluntary or compulsory. The majority of students supported voluntary membership and this was enacted. Referendums on the same issue were held in 2001 and 2003, and in each case, the majority of students voted for voluntary association. (The request for a referendum is in the form of a petition to the University Council, which any student may call, and thus must be conducted, provided no two referendums are less than two years apart.)

Detractors of voluntary student membership (VSM) say that AUSA suffers drastically from it, and that VSM undermines AUSA's ability to advocate on behalf of students and provide welfare services. They also say that in controlling the flow of money, the university dictates the terms to some extent of its operations through various agreements. As early as the mid-nineties, a number of incidents increased AUSA's credibility and alienated a lot of members who were previously disinterested in student politics, and were an undeniable factor in the 1999 referendum. Contentious issues like allocation of funds was the focus of many debates at the Quad.

Proponents of VSM, on the other hand, claim VSM means freedom of choice for students. They cite the United Nations declaration of freedom of association. They also paint AUSA executives under compulsory unionism as being wasteful, and believe that under voluntary AUSA executives are forced to be more accountable to members. They claim that the level of intervention is very limited (for example, the conditions are only that AUSA must run orientation and the like).

Craccum 

Craccum is the weekly magazine produced by the AUSA. The name originated from the scrambled acronym of "Auckland University College Men's Common Room Circular". The publication has frequently found itself in legal difficulties due to its deliberate attempts to be controversial. These attempts have included an issue containing methods to create a bomb, and an issue discussing ways to commit suicide.

A publicity stunt in 2005 saw Craccum sell its cover - which was bought by Salient, the student magazine of Victoria University of Wellington Students' Association, with funding from Victoria University of Wellington's marketing fund. The sale proved to be ironic; the theme of that issue of Craccum was corporate sellouts.

bFM 

95bFM (or simply bFM) is a typical student radio station that plays alternative music. Like other student broadcasters, it supports local artists well before they become mainstream.

Originally started as Radio Bosom, a capping stunt, bFM has gone a long way. Today, with voluntary student union membership, bFM is pushed to make a profit for the Association, and exists more as a corporate entity than a student radio station.

References

External links 
 AUSA
 List of AUSA clubs

Students' associations in New Zealand
University of Auckland